The 1995 Manitoba municipal elections were held on October 25, 1995 to elect mayors, councillors and school trustees in various communities throughout Manitoba, Canada.

Cities

Brandon

1995 Brandon municipal election, Councillor, Ward One (Assiniboine)

Barbara Bragg is founder and president of The Learning Company, a training centre that teaches students various aspects of computer technology. In 2002, she won a Contribution to Community Award.  As of 2007, she serves on the Brandon University Animal Care Committee.  She had previously served on Brandon's Board of Governors ini the 1990s, resigning in 1997.  Bragg campaigned for the Rosser Ward (Ward Two) a second time in a 1999 by-election, losing to Marion Robinsong.  Her husband, Marty Snelling, was the Progressive Conservative candidate for Brandon East in the 1999 provincial election.

1995 Brandon municipal election, Councillor, Ward Three (Victoria)

1995 Brandon municipal election, Councillor, Ward Four (University)

1995 Brandon municipal election, Councillor, Ward Five (Meadows)

1995 Brandon municipal election, Councillor, Ward Six (South Centre)

Romeo Lemieux represented Ward Seven on the Brandon City Council from 1992 to 1995.

1995 Brandon municipal election, Councillor, Ward Eight (Richmond)

1995, Brandon municipal election, Councillor, Ward Nine (Riverview)

1995 Brandon municipal election, Councillor, Ward Ten (Green Acres)

 Arnold Grambo served four terms on Brandon City Council from 1983 to 1995.

post-election changes

Mayor Rick Borotsik resigned his position in 1997, after being elected to the House of Commons of Canada.  A by-election was held to choose his replacement.

Dan Munroe was a former city councillor.  He was elected to represent the city's seventh ward in 1983 or earlier, and served until 1992.

Winnipeg

See: 1995 Winnipeg municipal election

Rural Municipalities

Rockwood

Towns

Hartney

Leo Peloquin was Mayor of Hartney from 1989 to 1998, and presided over a period of relative economic growth for the town.  He did not seek re-election in 1998.  He had previously served on council from 1986 to 1989. Peloquin is the father of professional wrestler Chi Chi Cruz.

Neepawa

Roy McGillivray was first elected as Mayor of Neepawa in 1992, defeating incumbent mayor Homer Gill by a two-to-one margin.  He was appointed to the provincial building standards board, and was re-elected to the mayoralty without opposition in 1995.  In 1996, he encouraged the construction of an Agro-Enviro Centre to support the local farm industry.  He did not seek re-election in 1998.  In 1999, he was appointed to a task force that assessed flooding damage to businesses in western and southwestern Manitoba.  He was critical of Ken Waddell, his successor as mayor, accusing him of "mixing religion with politics".

Villages

Waskada

Source: Winnipeg Free Press newspaper, 27 October 1995.

Footnotes

Municipal elections in Manitoba
1995 elections in Canada
1995 in Manitoba
October 1995 events in Canada